"That Word (L.O.V.E)" is a song by Australian pop group Rockmelons featuring Deni Hines. It was written by group member Bryon Jones, his brother Jonathan Jones, and Raymond Medhurst with Rashad Smith. It was released in April 1992 as the second single from their second studio album, Form 1 Planet (July 1992). The single peaked at number 4 on the Australian charts and number 5 on the New Zealand charts, which are the group's highest position in each market.

Background
In 1991, Rockmelons were joined by the song's lead vocalist, Deni Hines, to record three tracks for their second studio album, Form 1 Planet (July 1992). The group's line-up was Bryon Jones on keyboards, bass guitar and backing vocals; his brother Jonathon Jones on keyboards, guitar and drums; and Raymond Medhurst on keyboards.

"That Word (L.O.V.E)" was their second single with Hines and was released in April 1992. It was co-written by the group's members with Rashad Smith, and co-produced by Donovan Germain and the band. It peaked at number 4 on the Australian charts and number 5 on the New Zealand charts, which are the group's highest position in each market.

Track listings
All tracks were written by Rashad Smith, Bryon Jones, Jonathan Jones, and Raymond Medhurst.

7-inch single (K11097)
 "That Word (L.O.V.E.)" – 3:51
 "That Word (L.O.V.E.)" (extended toasted mix) – 4:39

CD and 12-inch single (X14353; D11097)
 "That Word (L.O.V.E.)" – 3:51
 "That Word (L.O.V.E.)" (extended toasted mix) – 4:39
 "That Word (L.O.V.E.)" (Penthouse of Joy mix) – 4:28

UK maxi-CD (74321 18853 2)
 "That Word (L.O.V.E.)" (toasted) – 4:11	
 "That Word (L.O.V.E.)" (untoasted) – 3:52	
 "That Word (L.O.V.E.)" (New York radio mix) – 4:16	
 "That Word (L.O.V.E.)" (Mafia & Fluxy mix) – 4:12

Charts

Weekly charts

Year-end charts

Certifications

Release history

References

External links
 The Rockmelons "That Word LOVE" – master

1992 songs
1992 singles
Mushroom Records singles